Albie is a given name, Notable people and characters with the name include:

People
 Albert Axelrod (1921–2004), American Olympic medalist foil fencer
 Albie Booth (1908–1959), American college football player
 Albie Grant (1943–2004), American basketball player
 Albie Hecht, American television producer and media executive
 Albie Lopez (born 1971), American baseball player
 Albie Morkel (born 1981), South African cricketer
 Albie Murphy (1930–2000), Irish footballer
 Albie Pearson (1934–2023), American baseball player
 Albie Reisz (1917–1985), American football player
 Albie Roles (1921–2012), English football player and manager
 Albie Sachs (born 1935), South African activist and former judge
 Albie Thomas (1935–2013), Australian middle- and long-distance runner
 Albie Thoms (1941–2012), Australian film director, writer and producer

Fictional characters
 Albie, the title character of Albie (TV series), a 2002–2004 British animated television series, as well as several books

See also
Albert (given name)

Masculine given names
Lists of people by nickname
Hypocorisms